Jerker Lysell  (born 27 April 1989) is a Swedish orienteering competitor, and world champion in sprint.

Career 
Lysell won a bronze medal in the sprint at the 2012 European Orienteering Championships in Falun, tying with Daniel Hubmann.

He competed at the 2012 World Orienteering Championships. In the sprint competition he qualified for the final, where he placed 13th.

He won gold medal in sprint at the 2016 World Orienteering Championships in Strömstad.

At the 2017 World Orienteering Championships in Tartu he was part of the Swedish winning team in the mixed sprint relay, and he won a bronze medal in the sprint contest.

References

External links

Living people
Swedish orienteers
Male orienteers
Foot orienteers
World Orienteering Championships medalists
World Games gold medalists
World Games bronze medalists
1989 births

Competitors at the 2013 World Games
Competitors at the 2017 World Games
World Games medalists in orienteering
21st-century Swedish people